The 2013 Tunis Open was a professional tennis tournament played on clay courts. It was the eighth edition of the tournament which was part of the 2013 ATP Challenger Tour. It took place in Tunis, Tunisia between 29 April and 5 May 2013.

Singles main draw entrants

Seeds

 1 Rankings are as of April 22, 2013.

Other entrants
The following players received wildcards into the singles main draw:
  Mohamed Haythem Abid
  Marcel Granollers
  Skander Mansouri
  Lamine Ouahab

The following player received entry using a protected ranking:
  Laurent Rochette

The following players received entry from the qualifying draw:
  Andrea Arnaboldi
  Michael Linzer
  Enrique López Pérez
  Florian Reynet

The following player received entry as a lucky loser:
  Riccardo Ghedin

Doubles main draw entrants

Seeds

1 Rankings as of April 22, 2013.

Other entrants
The following pairs received wildcards into the doubles main draw:
  Mehdi Abid /  Ameur Ben Hassen
  Skander Mansouri /  Lamine Ouahab
  Julien Obry /  Florian Reynet

The following pair received entry using a protected ranking:
  Laurent Rochette /  Diego Schwartzman

The following pair received entry as an alternate:
  Arnau Brugués Davi /  Enrique López Pérez

Champions

Singles

 Adrian Ungur def.  Diego Sebastián Schwartzman, 4–6, 6–0, 6–2

Doubles

 Dominik Meffert /  Philipp Oswald def.  Jamie Delgado /  Andreas Siljeström, 3–6, 7–6(7–0), [10–7]

External links
Official Website

Tunis Open
Tunis Open